Turpan Karez Paradise is a museum featuring Turpan's karez water management system,  in Turpan, a city in the Turpan Depression, Xinjiang, China. The karez is a vertical tunnel system connecting wells developed by the Turpan people to irrigate their arid land. The word karez means "well" (karez) in the local Uyghur language. Visitors to the museum can learn about the underground irrigation system in the desert area, and see the karez system in operation. 

This facility is in a relatively convenient location, about five kilometers from the city center of Turpan, about one kilometers from China National Highway 312.  The karez there, called Miyim Haji's Karez was built about 800 years ago.

See also
 Turpan water system
 Turpan Museum

References

Buildings and structures in Turpan
Museums in Xinjiang
Irrigation in China
Water management
Tourist attractions in Xinjiang